The 1951 Redex 100 was a motor race staged at the Mount Panorama Circuit, Bathurst, New South Wales, Australia on 26 March 1951.
It was held over 26 laps, a total distance of approximately 100 miles (161 km).
The race was contested on a handicap basis with the first car starting 11 minutes and 30 seconds minutes before the last car.

The race was won by F.W. Pratley driving a Monoskate.

Results

Race statistics
 Starters: 11
 Finishers: 3 (within race time limit)
 Non-finishers: 8 (4 outside race time limit, 4 retirements)

References

Motorsport in Bathurst, New South Wales
Redex 100
March 1951 sports events in Australia